Rotenburg I – Heidekreis is an electoral constituency (German: Wahlkreis) represented in the Bundestag. It elects one member via first-past-the-post voting. Under the current constituency numbering system, it is designated as constituency 35. It is located in northern Lower Saxony, comprising the Heidekreis district and the southern part of the Rotenburg district.

Rotenburg I – Heidekreis was created for the 1980 federal election. It was abolished in 2002 and re-established in the 2009 federal election. Since 2017, it has been represented by Lars Klingbeil of the Social Democratic Party (SPD).

Geography
Rotenburg I – Heidekreis is located in northern Lower Saxony. As of the 2021 federal election, it comprises the entirety of the Heidekreis district, as well as the municipalities of Rotenburg an der Wümme, Scheeßel, and Visselhövede and the Samtgemeinden of Bothel, Fintel, and Sottrum from the Rotenburg district.

History
Rotenburg I – Heidekreis was created in 1980, then known as Soltau – Rotenburg. In its first incarnation, it was constituency 30 in the numbering system. Originally, the constituency comprised the districts of Soltau-Fallingbostel and Rotenburg. In the 1987 election, it was renamed Soltau-Fallingbostel – Rotenburg II. It was abolished in the 2002 election, and divided between the new constituencies of Rotenburg – Verden and Soltau-Fallingbostel – Winsen L.

The constituency was re-established in the 2009 election, acquiring the name Rotenburg I – Soltau-Fallingbostel. It was constituency number 36. In the 2013 election, it was renamed to Rotenburg I – Heidekreis and became constituency number 34. Its borders have not changed since its re-establishment.

Members
The constituency was first held by Ingeborg Hoffmann of the Christian Democratic Union (CDU), who served from 1980 until 1990. She was succeeded by fellow CDU member Heinz-Günter Bargfrede, who served until 1998. In 1998, Kurt Palis of the Social Democratic Party (SPD) won the constituency, serving until its abolition in the next Bundestag term. After its re-establishment in the 2009 election, Reinhard Grindel of the CDU won the constituency and served two terms. In 2017, Lars Klingbeil was elected as representative.

Election results

2021 election

2017 election

2013 election

2009 election

References

Federal electoral districts in Lower Saxony
Hanover
1980 establishments in West Germany
Constituencies established in 1980